Ranganath Ramachandra Diwakar (30 September 1894 – 15 January 1990) was an Indian writer and politician from Karnataka.

Biography

R. R. Diwakar was born on 30 September 1894.  From the very beginning, he was interested in writing. He made many efforts to unify the Kannada linguistic regions.

He joined the Indian National Congress during the independence movement. Later he became a member of the Constituent Assembly and Provisional Parliament of India from Bombay State. He served as the Union Minister of Information and Broadcasting in the Nehru cabinet (from 1 April 1949 to 15 April 1952).

He was elected as a member of the Rajya Sabha from Bombay State on 3 April 1952, but resigned on 13 June 1952.  Within two days he was appointed the Governor of Bihar (15 June 1952 to 5 July 1957). He was nominated to the Rajya Sabha in 1962 from Karnataka where he served till 1968.

After 1968, he distanced himself from politics and wrote several books in English, Kannada and Hindi. He died on 15 January 1990.

References

External links 
Brief Biodata

Nominated members of the Rajya Sabha
1894 births
1990 deaths
Governors of Bihar
Indian National Congress politicians from Karnataka
Members of the Constituent Assembly of India
Rajya Sabha members from Maharashtra
20th-century Indian politicians
Kannada-language writers
Hindi-language writers
English-language writers from India
Writers from Karnataka
Ministers for Information and Broadcasting of India